James Harris (18 August 1933 – April 2022) was an English professional footballer who played as a centre forward for Everton and Birmingham City in the First Division. The strengths of his game were his pace and a clear eye for goal.

Biography
Harris made his debut for Everton, replacing Dave Hickson, in 1955 and finished his debut season as the club's top scorer with 21 goals in all competitions. He was also capped for England under-23 that season, scoring in a 3–1 win against Scotland under-23 at Hillsborough in February 1956. When moved to outside right on Hickson's return in 1957 he was able to use his pace and still kept scoring. The following season, 1957–58, he scored a hat-trick away at Tottenham Hotspur only for Everton to lose 10–4.

In 1960, having scored 72 goals in 207 appearances in all competitions for Everton, Harris was sold to Birmingham City for a fee of £20,000. He was the club's top scorer in each of his first two seasons at Birmingham City, and in four years scored 53 goals in 113 games in all competitions. He played in their 1960–61 Inter-Cities Fairs Cup campaign when they reached the final against Roma, and was largely responsible for them getting that far. In the semi-final against Inter Milan he scored three times, including the first goal of the 2–1 win at the San Siro, the only time Inter had lost at home to an English club until Arsenal repeated the feat over forty years later. He won his only major medal when he played on the winning side in the 1963 Football League Cup Final.

After leaving Birmingham he moved on to Third Division club Oldham Athletic, and played once in the League Cup for Tranmere Rovers of the Fourth Division. He signed for Cheshire League club Rhyl in September 1966, but injury delayed his debut, and, after reportedly agreeing a deal with struggling Irish club Sligo Rovers, Harris signed instead for St Patrick's Athletic on 19 October.
and made his debut that night in a League of Ireland Shield game against Shamrock Rovers. In his second Shield game he got his first goal for Pats which sealed the club's participation in the following season's Inter-Cities Fairs Cup. He made his League of Ireland debut on the opening day of the 1966–67 season at Waterford. His first league goal came in November against Dundalk. In three months at Richmond Park, Harris scored three goals in eight total appearances. He returned to the Cheshire League in February 1967 with Ellesmere Port Town, where he was later appointed player-manager.

Harris married Joan Boardman in 1967. His death was reported on 17 April 2022.

Honours
Birmingham City
 Inter-Cities Fairs Cup: runner-up 1960–61
 Football League Cup: 1962–63

Individual
 Everton top scorer: 1956
 Birmingham City top scorer: 1961, 1962

References

1933 births
2022 deaths
Sportspeople from Birkenhead
English footballers
England under-23 international footballers
Association football forwards
Everton F.C. players
Birmingham City F.C. players
Oldham Athletic A.F.C. players
Tranmere Rovers F.C. players
Rhyl F.C. players
St Patrick's Athletic F.C. players
Ellesmere Port Town F.C. players
English Football League players
League of Ireland players
English Football League representative players
English football managers
Ellesmere Port Town F.C. managers
English expatriate footballers
English expatriate sportspeople in Ireland
Expatriate association footballers in the Republic of Ireland